Wildlife Control is an American indie rock band and creative lab originally from Brooklyn, New York and San Francisco, California formed in 2011 by brothers Neil Shah (lead vocals, guitar, piano) and Sumul Shah (vocals, drums, guitar). Touring members include Moppa Elliott (bass) and Kevin Thaxton (bass).

History
Wildlife Control released their debut single Analog or Digital in December 2011 with an interactive video using HTML5, JavaScript, and the SoundCloud API. In February 2012, they released the official music video for Analog or Digital on YouTube. It went viral, officially trending during the first weekend of its release. The widespread reach of the videos resulted in Analog or Digital and the band's subsequently released EP, Spin to hit No. 1 on Amazon MP3's "Hot New Releases" sales chart in the Alternative Pop category.

In April 2012, Wildlife Control held a four-week residency at Arlene's Grocery in New York City while touring through several major cities including Philadelphia, Washington D.C., Boston, Chicago, and San Francisco.

Wildlife Control released their self-titled debut album on July 31, 2012. The album received favorable reviews from several major media outlets, with Wired declaring it "A great debut album from an indie band who really seem to be creating their own musical pulse." Two songs from the album hit the Hype Machine "Popular" chart, with People Change reaching No. 1 and Spin reaching No. 4.  The band held album premiere shows at Mercury Lounge in New York City and Bottom of the Hill in San Francisco.

On August 22, 2012, Wildlife Control peaked at No. 48 on the CMJ Radio 200 chart, making it the highest ranked self-released album for that week. Notable commercial radio DJs including Aaron Axelsen at KITS in San Francisco and Nic Harcourt have featured Wildlife Control songs on their programs. On November 28, 2012, Analog or Digital reached No. 12 on the FMQB SubModern Singles chart.

Wildlife Control headlined The Deli Magazine's Avant Pop show at the 2012 CMJ Music Marathon.

South By Southwest announced on their website that Wildlife Control is scheduled to appear at the annual SXSW Music Festival in 2013.

On January 18, 2013, MTV Hive premiered a new Wildlife Control single titled Different, announcing a release date of January 29, 2013. The band then released another single titled Ages Places on March 8, 2013, while announcing details of their upcoming SXSW performances.

Popular Science premiered Particles on April 8, 2016 describing it as "one of the year's more forward thinking album releases." The album is composed of three movements: Illusion, Subtract, and Creature. Particles also features a 12-minute film by the same name with the music set to Hyperlapse videos from users around the world.

The Showtime documentary More Than T, featuring an original score by Wildlife Control, premiered on June 23, 2017. The film profiles seven members of the trans community and highlights their "passions, hopes for the future and life's work." Wildlife Control released the film's soundtrack on June 1, 2017, with The Burning Ear describing the music as "grand, sweeping, and full of hope."

Discography

Albums

Extended plays

Singles

Media
Aux (TV channel) Track of the Week on July 6, 2012 
Billboard Next Big Sound Top 25 Chart on July 28, 2012 
SoundCloud Soundclouder of the Day on July 31, 2012 
Last.fm Most Hyped Artist - Alternative Rock on September 9, 2012 
Channel One News  Hear it Now Artist of the Week on September 17, 2012

References

External links
 Official web site
  

American indie rock groups